Salonit Anhovo is a cement factory in the small village of Anhovo, Slovenia, about 20 kilometres north of Nova Gorica. Salonit Anhovo is the biggest producer of cement in Slovenia. Cementarna Trbovlje is second with a capacity of 550,000 tons.

History

Early history
Salonit Anhovo dates back in the beginning of the 20th century, when construction worker Ivan Nibrant prepared limestone and discovered a grey dust with excellent binding properties. An entrepreneur from Split, Croatia, Emil Stock in 1919 discovered that it was an excellent source for making cement. He began constructing 16 vertical Dietzsche furnaces with a capacity of 160 tons of klinker a day. The called the factory Cementi Isonzo S.A. (Cement Factory of River Soča). It produced its first cement on May 2, 1921.

After WW2
The first major modernisation happened in 1961, when the old furnaces were replaced with rotary kiln with a capacity of 350 tons of klinker per day. Cement from Anhovo soon became the best quality cement in Yugoslavia. In 1977 after four years of hard work, a new factory was built with a capacity of 2,000 tons of klinker per day. Despite this, it was only in 1986 that the company produced over 1 million ton of cement per year.

1990s
The company introduced new technologies and reduced environmental footprint. In 1996 asbestos production was finally shut down and the company started a cleaning process. The plant uses used car tires and coal with a high sulphur content, which is absorbed into the klinker, so there are no significant emissions into the environment.

21st century
In January 2005, Salonit Anhovo became the majority owner (54.93% ownership share) of the construction materials manufacturer Kema Puconci.

In August 2014, the Italian company Buzzi Unicem (which produces cement and other building materials) entered the ownership of Salonita Anhovo with a 25% ownership share.

The company reorganized and invested in a new heat exchanger, which is one of the tallest buildings in Slovenia. The klinker line increased to a capacity of 3500 tons, which means over 4000 tons of cement per day. The demand for cement in the country decreased because four of the biggest construction companies of Slovenia SCT, Vegrad, Primorje and Kraški Zidar went bankrupt. According to the Civil Initiative Today, in 2022 Salonit Anhovo is expected to double the volume of waste co-incineration; This is supposed to cover 220 thousand tons of waste per year (or 600 tons of waste per day).

Sister companies
 ESAL
 INDE

Sponsorships
Salonit Anhovo is the main sponsor of the volleyball club Barksdale Hawks.

External links

References 

Manufacturing companies established in 1921
Slovenian brands
Cement companies of Slovenia
1921 establishments in Slovenia